Springhead is a suburban area in the civil parish of Saddleworth in the Metropolitan Borough of Oldham, in Greater Manchester, England.

Description 
Situated near the eastern edge of the Greater Manchester Urban Area, Springhead is contiguous with the village of Lees, and with the Austerlands, Scouthead and Grotton areas of Saddleworth. It was named after Springhead House, an historical dwelling which had a freshwater spring in its grounds.

Springhead once was an urban district in the West Riding of Yorkshire. The main hub is the Post Office. There is also a community centre. Springhead Infant and Nursery School and Knowsley Junior School serve the area. The football club (Springhead A.F.C.) play in the Manchester Football League, and the cricket club, Springhead CCC, in the Greater Manchester Cricket League.

In March 2022, a petition was submitted to the parish council to construct 158 homes on the former Springhead Quarry, now a protected site for conservation.

During the COVID-19 pandemic, Springhead and the neighbouring village of Grasscroft had some of the highest infection rates in Greater Manchester.

Transport 
Springhead's bus services are operated by First Greater Manchester, M Travel (Manchester) and Stagecoach Manchester.

The Grotton and Springhead railway station - nicknamed the 'Delph Donkey' due to the previous route of the passenger service ending at Delph - once served the village. Passenger service was withdrawn in 1955, and the line closed in 1963. The track has been lifted since and replaced with a bridle path which follows alongside a large length of the original railway.

Culture 
In the Higher Springhead area, there is a longstanding tradition of the mayor leading the town's brass band contest on Whit Friday, wearing a ceremonial clog iron suspended on a lavatory chain and adorned with barrel-shaped dog tags engraved with the names of previous mayors. The tradition dates back to the late 1940s in the village of Austerlands.

Notable people 
Judith Barker (born 1943), television actress
Herman Hilton (1894–1947), rugby league footballer
Annie Kenney (1879–1953), English working-class suffragette
Thomas Steele (1891–1978), recipient of the Victoria Cross

References

See also 

Listed buildings in Saddleworth

Areas of Greater Manchester
Geography of the Metropolitan Borough of Oldham
Saddleworth